Bloom Trail High School is a public high school in Steger, Illinois, a south suburb of Chicago, in the United States. It is part of Bloom Township High School District 206. Originally the Bloom Township Freshman-Sophomore Division, in 1976 it became a four-year high school and was renamed Bloom Trail High School. Sports for both Bloom High School and Bloom Trail High School are combined since 1995. Football, volleyball, basketball, track, games/practices are held at Bloom Trail.

Academics

The average ACT score at the school is an 18. The class of 2017 set a record for the number of students (33) who passed the PSAE, which allows the students to go to the local community college, Prairie State College, to take college courses.

Attendance Area 
Bloom Trail High School serves the communities of Steger, Sauk Village, Crete, South Chicago Heights, Ford Heights, a small portion of Chicago Heights, and parts of Lynwood. The following schools feed into Bloom Trail High School:
Columbia Central Middle School (Steger), Rickover Jr. High School (Sauk Village),  and Cottage Grove Middle School (Ford Heights).

References

External links
Bloom Trail High School – Official site.
 Bloom Township High School District 206 – Official site.

Chicago Heights, Illinois
Public high schools in Cook County, Illinois
Educational institutions established in 1964
1964 establishments in Illinois